Culladiella is a genus of moths of the family Crambidae.

Species
Culladiella acacia Schouten, 1993
Culladiella anjai Schouten, 1993
Culladiella generosus (Meyrick, 1936)
Culladiella sinuimargo (Hampson, 1919)
Culladiella subsinuimargo Bleszynski, 1970

References

Crambinae
Crambidae genera
Taxa named by Stanisław Błeszyński